The Nero Siciliano is a breed of domestic pig from the Mediterranean island of Sicily, in southern Italy. It is raised mainly in the province of Messina, particularly in the Monti Nebrodi. It is one of the six autochthonous pig breeds recognised by the Ministero delle Politiche Agricole Alimentari e Forestali, the Italian ministry of agriculture and forestry.

History
A herdbook was established in 2001, and is kept by the Associazione Nazionale Allevatori Suini, the Italian national association of pig breeders. At the end of 2012 there were 3,642 pigs registered.

Use
The Nero Siciliano is raised both for fresh meat and for salumi. The principal salumi are the Salame Sant'Angelo, which has IGP status, and Prosciutto di Suino Nero dei Nebrodi; capocollo, guanciale, and coppa are also produced.

References

Pig breeds originating in Italy